Rachel Naomi Hilson (born October 30, 1995) is an American actress. She started her career in 2010 with a recurring role on the CBS legal drama The Good Wife as Nisa Dalmar.  She has also had recurring roles on NBC's Rise and This Is Us and a starring role on the Hulu teen drama, Love, Victor.

Early life and education
Rachel Naomi Hilson was born on October 30, 1995, in Baltimore, Maryland. She is the daughter of Anita and Robert Hilson. She has a sister named Kimberly. Hilson began dancing at age 3. While she had many aspirations like other kids her age, including being a surgeon, an astronaut thanks to Mae Jemison, a news anchor and an author, having written and illustrated books on printer paper, her passions for dance stuck. Hilson told Backstage "I dedicated my life to Nutcrackers, spring recitals, dance camps" and recreating scenes from the 2000 movie Center Stage, starring Zoe Saldaña as Eva. She was discovered by an agent at age 12 and took up acting. That summer, her mother convinced Hilson to attend the Broadway Artist Alliance in New York. While she auditioned for the dance division, Hilson also had to read sides and perform a song. She was then recruited by her future agent, Nancy Carson of the Carson-Adler Agency, to dance in episodes of the children's musical series, LazyTown. After traveling to Iceland with her mom for the tapings, Hilson signed with Carson a few months later. From there, she auditioned for the Baltimore School for the Arts (BSA). At BSA, Hilson continued dancing and acting, but also participated in sports. Hilson credited her high school theater program with helping her overcome her shyness. After high school, Hilson attended the New York University's Gallatin School of Individualized Study where she created her own curriculum. Throughout her college career, Hilson appeared in several theater productions including Hamlet. She graduated in 2018 with a concentration in Writing and Performing Race. In college, Hilson worked as a bread salesman, even servicing actress Lupita Nyong'o at one point.

Career

2010–2018: The Good Wife and early roles 
Living in Baltimore, Hilson, alongside her mother would take bus rides to New York for auditions. They felt encouraged when she booked her very first auditions, one of which was a short film and the other, The Good Wife where she recurred as Nisa. This marked her television debut and she only 15 at the time. The series was headlined by Julianna Margulies and fellow BSA alumni Josh Charles. In an essay for Backstage magazine, Hilson insisted that it was just luck as she faced rejected quite a bit after that. However, Over the next decade, Hilson would appear as an episodic guest star in several prime time television series. She has appeared in episodes of Royal Pains, Elementary, Nurse Jackie, The Affair, Madam Secretary, The Americans, Law & Order: Special Victims Unit and First Wives Club. Later, Hilson starred opposite Halle Berry in her first feature film, Kings which premiered at the 2017 Toronto International Film Festival. The movie received a wide release in April 2018. Hilson admitted that she awkwardly confessed to having an allergic reaction to makeup when she first met Berry who gifted her with a facial kit. However, the project was a "dream come true" for Hilson. That same year, she recurred as Harmony on NBC's short lived musical drama, Rise. Hilson appeared in all 10 episodes and the role required her to sing and act. For Hilson, it was very reminiscent of her high school experience.

2019–2022: This Is Us, Love, Victor and Winning Time 
In 2019, Hilson would recur on This Is Us as the teenage version Beth Pearson, played by Susan Kelechi Watson. Hilson would work opposite Phylicia Rashad as Beth's mother. Hilson, who didn't even own a tv at the time, binged the entire series after she booked the role. On August 30, 2019, Hilson replaced Johnny Sequoyah as Mia in Love, Victor, the sequel to the 2018 film, Love, Simon due to a decision to take the character in a new creative direction. Writers Isaac Aptaker and Elizabeth Berger actually retooled the character for Hilson. Hilson had previously auditioned for the role of Abby in the movie which eventually went to Alexandra Shipp. Mia would mark Hilson's first role as a series regular. Hilson later revealed that one of the producers at This Is Us had actually recommended her for the role of Mia. Ironically, Hilson watched Love, Simon for the first time just before she won the role of Mia. After she booked the gig, she read Simon vs. the Homo Sapiens Agenda, the novel that inspired the film. According to Hilson, Mia afforded her "the opportunity to tell a unique and nuanced story about a young Black teenage girl."  On August 21, 2021, Hilson joined the cast of HBO's Winning Time: The Rise of the Lakers Dynasty.

Filmography

Film

Television

References

External links
 

1995 births
Living people
21st-century American actresses
Actresses from Baltimore
African-American actresses
American television actresses
American film actresses
New York University Gallatin School of Individualized Study alumni